Michael Cohen (born 1970) is an Australian writer and presenter of articles on events claimed to be paranormal, and self-professed psychic. Cohen, who began his career as a 'radio psychic' and 'paranormal presenter' has been described by the Huffington Post as 'the new P.T. Barnum of the modern era' in reference to his supposed abilities to doctor and conjure up footage of paranormal events. He has been responsible for publicizing and allegedly fabricating a large number of high-profile events related to UFO witness reports, alleged alien sightings and cryptids including the 'Jerusalem UFO event,' and an alleged alien corpse discovered in Siberia, amongst many others.

Notable controversies
In 2011, he claimed that the Dean of the Faculty of Archaeology at Cairo University (whom he incorrectly described as the country's Head of Antiquities), Dr. Ala Shaheen, had declared that the Pyramids in Giza contained alien technology, although he had not. Shaheen was forced to publish a formal refutation of this claim. In 2012, Cohen released what he claimed was video footage of a woolly mammoth that had survived to modern times and was alive in Siberia. The footage was soon discovered to be doctored, and Cohen apologized and announced he had been fooled, although the originators of the footage blamed Cohen for the incident and the Sydney Morning Herald referred to him as a 'serial hoaxer.' The Huffington Post pointed out that he in fact held copyright over the video, which even has the words 'Siberian Mammoth Copyright Michael Cohen/Barcroft Media' superimposed on it. The footage was found to be identical to footage shot by documentary maker Lou Petho; when confronted with this, Cohen suggested Petho had 'filmed the same spot at another time,' despite the two clips, apart from the mammoth, being entirely identical to one another, including the movements of clouds and water. The story was named by the Huffington Post as the top paranormal story of 2012.

References

1970 births
Living people
Writers from Sydney